Flick  of Flicks may refer to:

Arts
 Flick, slang term for film or movie
Chick flick, slang, sometimes derogatory, term for films aimed at a female audience
 Flick (2000 film), Irish film
 Flick (2008 film), a campy British horror film written and directed by David Howard
 The Flick, a 2013 off-Broadway play by Annie Baker

Characters
 Felicity Scully ("Flick"), a fictional character from the Australian soap opera Neighbours
 Flick, a character from the 1983 Christmas film A Christmas Story
 Flick Duck, a character from the American animated children's television series PB&J Otter
 Herr Otto Flick, a fictional character in the BBC sitcom Allo 'Allo!
 Tracy Flick, a fictional character who is the subject of the 1998 novel Election by Tom Perrotta

People

Surname
 Bertolt Flick (born 1964), German businessman
 Elmer Flick (1876–1971), American baseball player
 Flick family, a German family with an industrial empire
 Friedrich Flick (1883–1972), German industrialist and convicted Nazi war criminal
 Flick Trial, the fifth of twelve Nazi war crimes trials held by United States authorities in their occupation zone in Germany
 Otto-Ernst Flick (1916–1974), oldest of three sons born to Marie and Friedrich Flick in 1916 in Germany
 Friedrich Karl Flick (1927–2006), German-Austrian industrialist and billionaire
 Gert-Rudolf Flick (born 1943), German art historian and collector
 Friedrich Christian Flick (born 1944), German-Swiss art collector
 Donatella Flick, Italian philanthropist
 Hansi Flick (born 1965), German football manager and former player
 James Patton Flick (1845–1929), two-term Republican U.S. Representative
 Lawrence Flick (1856–1938), American physician
 Thorsten Flick (born 1976), German footballer

Given name
 Flick Colby (1946–2011), American dancer and choreographer
 Flick Rea, English Liberal Democrat politician

Other
 DVD Flick, an open source DVD authoring application for Windows
 Flick (fencing), a technique used in modern fencing
 Flick (physics), a unit of spectral radiance
 Flick (time), a unit of time a bit longer than a nanosecond, created by Facebook, used in video production
 Flicks (website), an online platform for moviegoers hosted by Vista Group International
 Flicks (Cartoon Network), a 2008–14 Cartoon Network programming block

See also
 FLIC (disambiguation)
 Flicker (disambiguation)
 Flik (disambiguation)